Oncidium hastilabium is a species of orchid found from northwestern Venezuela to western South America.

External links
 Photos

hastilabium